Germany women's junior national goalball team is the women's junior national team of Germany.  Goalball is a team sport designed specifically for athletes with a vision impairment.  The team takes part in international goalball competitions.

IBSA World Youth and Student Games

2007 USA 

The 2007 IBSA World Youth and Student Games were held in the United States.  The team was one of four teams participating, with the United States finishing first, Germany second, Russia third and Canada fourth.

Competitive history 

The table below contains individual game results for the team in international matches and competitions.

References

National junior women's goalball teams
Germany at the Paralympics
Goalball in Germany
National youth sports teams of Germany
European national goalball teams